Pensions in Germany are based on a “three pillar system”.

 First pillar: mandatory state pension insurance (gesetzliche Rentenversicherung). This part of the basic social security system. All employees and employers pay a percentage of salaries into this system.
 Second pillar: voluntary occupational pension insurance
 Third pillar: private insurance

Mandatory state pension provision
The scheme is based on the pay-as-you-go (or redistributive) model. Funds paid in by contributors (employees and employers) are not saved (or invested) but are used to pay current pension obligations.

Civil servants in Germany do not pay any contributions themselves but their salaries are correspondingly lower than those in the private sector.

Recent changes to the system mean that from 2012 to 2023 the retirement age will go up to 66 by 2023. From 2023 the retirement age will be increased by two
months each year, until 2031, when the mandatory retirement age reaches 67. Each missing year results in a 3.6% reduction in the pension entitlement.

The state scheme is financed by a payroll tax known as "social security contributions". The rate in 2012 is 19.6% of pay up to the social security contribution ceiling of €67,200 (Western Bundesländer) and €57,600 (Eastern Bundesländer). The amount is paid half and half by employer and employee contributions.

The amount paid to retirees is based on average salaries. The German pension insurance agency publishes the value of each year’s contribution (remuneration point). This is then multiplied the number of years contributed and the percentage of the average salary earned during the person's lifetime. The average pension in 2012 was €1,263.15 per month. The maximum pension for someone having earned twice the average salary (€64,200) would be €2,526.30.

Voluntary occupational pension provision
The Voluntary Occupational Pension schemes (Betriebliche Altersvorsorge) were created under the Company Pensions Law (Betriebsrentengesetz) in 1974 and are a benefit granted by a company to its employees. Voluntary schemes can fall into different categories:
Defined benefit (Leistungszusage)
Defined Contribution (Beitragsorientierte Leistungszusage)
Contribution with minimum benefit
The schemes can be structured in various ways:
Direct Grant (Direktzusage)
Support Fund (Unterstützungskasse)
Pension Company (Pensionskasse)
Direct Insurance (Direktversicherung)
Pension Fund (Pensionsfonds)

In 2009 contributions up to €2,500 (Betriebsbemessungsgrenze) were tax free. A further €1,800 in contributions to Direct Insurance schemes are tax free. About 50% of workers in Germany are covered by these schemes.

According to the Deutsches Institut für Zeitwertkonten und Pension Lösungen, a consultancy, "in almost all firms, 30 to 50% of the capital required to meet the commitments made in days when the interest rates were higher is missing". The Germans have invested 500 billion euros in Voluntary Occupational Pension and 170 to 225 billion euros are needed to fill in the coverage gap.

Private provision
Private pension schemes in Germany are personal funded pensions. The funds are protected by law and cannot be seized by creditors or the state. They are also not inheritable. Payments into these funds benefit from a government sponsored tax credit of €154 per year per adult and up to an additional €300 if the fund beneficiary has children. The most popular form of private pension provisions is the so-called Riester Pension. The annual government expenditure for the tax credits is at around €7bn. An alternative government sponsored private pension scheme is the Rürup Pension, which is specifically, albeit not exclusively, designed for self-employed people, who are usually not eligible for the Riester Pension.

Germans can take early retirement if they agree to forgo a percentage of their state pension.

See also
UK pensions
US pensions
Pensions in France
Pension system in Switzerland
Sozialgesetzbuch
Pan-European Pension

References

Germany
Old age in Germany
Social security in Germany